Olaf Mertelsmann (born 15 January 1969) is a German historian and a professor at the University of Tartu.  Dr. Mertelsmann's primary interest is the history of the Soviet Union, with concentration on post-war period. He has been living in Estonia since 1994.

Publications 
 Die Sowjetisierung des estnischen Alltags während des Stalinismus. in: Norbert Angermann et al.: Ostseeprovinzen, Baltische Staaten und das Nationale, LIT Verlag, Münster 2005 .

References

External links 
Profile at University of Tartu

20th-century German historians
1969 births
Living people
University of Hamburg alumni
Historians of Europe
German male non-fiction writers
Academic staff of the University of Tartu